Muhamad Sadiq Ahangaran (born 2 February 1957 A.D./1336 A.H. in Dezful), commonly known as Haj Sadiq Ahangaran or just Ahangaran, is an Iranian Zaker (Islamic Singer-songwriter of Dhikr), former Soldier of the Iran–Iraq War and leading member of the Islamic Revolution Committee.

Life

Ahangaran's complete first name is Muhamad Sadiq, his previous surname having been Ahangari. Moreover, while he was raised in Ahwaz, he is originally from the city of Dezful. Ahangaran embarked his Maddahi since his teenage period by singing (religiously/sorrowfully) in Hay'ats which are religious foundation holding mourning ceremonies. He got married when he was at the age of 23. His offspring are included three sons and a daughter.

Sadiq Ahangaran used to recite prayer supplications (between Salah), Du'a Kumayl, and also singing (religiously/sadly) in Sineh-Zani besides singing during the operations – in Iran–Iraq War. His first Noha which was shown live on television, was the called "Ey Shahidan Beh Khoon-Ghaltaneh Khuzestan Durood" based on a poem originally by Habibullah Moalemi, Ahangaran recited it in Jamaran by the attendance of Sayyid Ruhollah Khomeini, which was run several times on Iranian TV.

Works
Among the albums of Sadiq Ahangaran are as follows:
 Daghe Azali (eternal bereaved)
 Dashte Karbala (The plain of Karbala)
 Atash wa Aatash (Fire and thirst)
 Tak Taranehha (single songs)

Amongst the Nohas of Sadiq Ahangaran are as follows:
 Khuzestan
 Koo Shahidan ma (Where are our martyrs?)
 Ba nawaye Karavan (with the air of the caravan)
 Karbala Montazere Mast, bia ta Berawim (Karbala is waiting for us, come to go)
Aman Az Del Zeynab

See also 
 Saeed Haddadian
 Mahmoud Karimi
Mohammadreza Taheri

References

External links 
 The well-known Nohas of Haj Sadiq Ahangaran
 selected Nohas of Haj Sadiq Ahangaran

People from Dezful
People from Ahvaz
1957 births
Living people
Maddahs